Anville is a relatively small, solitary lunar impact crater located in the north part of the Mare Fecunditatis. It is named after French cartographer Jean-Baptiste d'Anville. This is a circular, cup-shaped formation with a sharp edge and little appearance of wear. Some minor slumping has occurred in the eastern half of the interior wall. It was designated Taruntius G prior to being assigned a name by the IAU. Taruntius itself lies to the north-northwest, at the edge of the mare.

References

External links
 

Impact craters on the Moon